The 1988 United States Senate election in Nevada was held on November 8, 1988. Incumbent Republican U.S. Senator Chic Hecht ran for re-election to a second term, but was defeated by Democratic Governor Richard Bryan.

Democratic primary

Candidates 
 Richard Bryan, Governor of Nevada
 Patrick Matthew "Pat" Fitzpatrick
 Manny Beals
 Larry Kepler

Results

Republican primary

Candidates 
 Chic Hecht, incumbent U.S. Senator
 Larry Scheffler

Results

General election

Candidates 
 Richard Bryan (D), Governor of Nevada
 Chic Hecht (R), incumbent U.S. Senator

Results

See also 
  1988 United States Senate elections

References 

Nevada
1980
1988 Nevada elections